The Central Bank of the Turkish Republic of Northern Cyprus, is the central bank of Northern Cyprus. It was established on 16 May 1983.  Norther Cyprus uses the Turkish lira as currency and the main central banking functions are provided by the Central Bank of the Republic of Turkey.

The bank's headquarters are located in North Nicosia, the capital of Northern Cyprus.

The bank is also a member of Islamic Financial Services Board(IFSB).

Chairmen

See also

Ministry of Finance of Northern Cyprus
Economy of Northern Cyprus
Turkish lira

References

External links
 Central Bank of the Turkish Republic of Northern Cyprus official site in Turkish language

Banks of Northern Cyprus
Banks established in 1983
Northern Cyprus
Government of Northern Cyprus
Organisations based in Northern Cyprus
1983 establishments in Northern Cyprus
Buildings and structures in North Nicosia